Rock a Little is the third solo studio album by the American singer and songwriter Stevie Nicks.

Released in late 1985 while Fleetwood Mac were still on a lengthy hiatus following their album Mirage (1982), Rock a Little hit the top 20 in its second week. The album peaked at No. 12 on the US Billboard 200, and was certified Platinum by the Recording Industry Association of America (RIAA) after just one month of its release for sales in excess of 1,000,000 units. The album was also certified Gold in the United Kingdom for sales in excess of 100,000 units.  The album was ranked No. 41 in the best-selling albums of 1986 in the United States, although sales did not match Nicks' earlier albums, Bella Donna (1981) and The Wild Heart (1983) (which have sold in excess of four and two million copies in the US, respectively).

Rock a Little produced the hit singles "Talk to Me" (US No. 4), "I Can't Wait" (US No. 16), and the mainstay encore for Nicks' live shows "Has Anyone Ever Written Anything for You?" (US No. 60). A fourth single, "Imperial Hotel", was released in Australia only.

Album history
Recording for her follow-up project to 1983's multi-platinum album The Wild Heart originally began in 1984. Selected songs were recorded, including "Running Through the Garden" and "Mirror Mirror". However, Nicks scrapped these recordings and parted ways with long-time producer and romantic interest Jimmy Iovine, and in late 1984 began work on what is now recognized as the Rock a Little project. "Running Through the Garden" would resurface in completed form in 2003 on the Fleetwood Mac album Say You Will.

The album is reputed to have cost $1million to record (according to Mick Fleetwood in his autobiography), and is seen as a watershed in the singer's career. Nicks' vocal style is distinctively huskier and nasal (many claim this was due to increasing cocaine abuse) than on previous recordings. It was later revealed that Martin Page and Bernie Taupin had specially written the track "These Dreams" for inclusion on the album, but Nicks turned it down. The track was then recorded by the band Heart and became their first number 1 hit in 1986. Tom Petty and David A. Stewart also wrote "Don't Come Around Here No More" for the album, but after hearing Petty perform the vocals for her, she declined it as well, feeling she couldn't do the song justice. Tom Petty and the Heartbreakers later released the song on their Southern Accents album.

Nicks had recorded various other tracks prior to the album's release, including "Battle Of The Dragon", a moody and intricate contemplation of stormy relationships. Rather than include on her own album, it was featured on the movie soundtrack for American Anthem, as well as on Nicks' 3-disc retrospective Enchanted in 1998. A duet with Eagles drummer and former lover Don Henley titled "Reconsider Me" would also see the cutting room floor, and the rock ballad "One More Big Time Rock and Roll Star" was relegated to the B-side of the "Talk to Me" single.

Many other discarded demos from the sessions have never seen the light of day, but a few, including "Greta" and "Love Is Like A River", were dusted off for Nicks' 1994 album, Street Angel. The song "Thousand Days" was also relegated to a B-side. "Mirror, Mirror" was tried out again for 1989's The Other Side of the Mirror, and was again revisited in 1994 for inclusion on Street Angel, but ultimately the original Rock a Little version was only released on a cassette single of "Blue Denim" in 1994.

Jimmy Iovine was originally brought in to produce the album and work on the demo recordings in 1984. However, he parted ways with Nicks midway through the recording sessions, claiming he did not like the direction in which Nicks wanted to take the album. It was later revealed that the two had been in a relationship for several years. Nicks' subsequent relationship with Eagles member Joe Walsh produced the ballad "Has Anyone Ever Written Anything for You". Keith Olsen, Rick Nowels and Nicks herself took over production duties after Iovine's departure.

Upon its release in November 1985, Rock a Little received very mixed reviews. Combined with Nicks' growing addiction to cocaine at the time which hampered her tour performances (she would famously check into the Betty Ford Clinic at the tour's conclusion), the album did not achieve sales or chart positions expected of Nicks at that time. It entered the U.S. Billboard chart at No. 60, eventually peaking at No. 12 in its ninth week of release. The album spent 35 weeks on the Billboard 200 chart, including 13 weeks in the Top 20.

Music videos
Promotional videos were shot for the singles "Talk to Me" and "I Can't Wait". In 1986 a 6-track VHS tape titled I Can't Wait was released in many territories, and featured the following promos:

"Stop Draggin' My Heart Around"
"Leather and Lace" (Live, 1981 Bella Donna Tour)
"Stand Back"
"If Anyone Falls"
"Talk to Me"
"I Can't Wait"

This release is notable for including a live solo performance of "Leather and Lace" from the last night of Nicks' 1981 Bella Donna Tour, which was cut from the VHS release of White Wing Dove: Stevie Nicks Live, a 9-track edit of the same concert. The version was used as the song's music video, and was played on MTV in 1981.

Five of these promos are included on the DVD supplement to Nicks' 2008 collection Crystal Visions — The Very Best of Stevie Nicks, but the only DVD availability of the live version of "Leather and Lace" is the Australian release of Fleetwood Mac's Mirage Tour concert, for which all six videos of the I Can't Wait collection are included as a special bonus feature.

Tour
The US leg of the Rock a Little Tour kicked off in 1986 and concluded with a show at the famous Red Rocks Amphitheatre in Colorado, which was captured and released on video (and later on DVD) usually entitled Live at Red Rocks. Evidence of Nicks' drug abuse is apparent in both performance and vocals, but the show is noticeably 'cleaned up' with re-shot close-ups, inserts and vocal overdubs. The video/DVD is also a shortened version of the actual setlist, clocking in at only 57 minutes, 15 of which are devoted to a very lengthy version of "Edge of Seventeen" though this was adjusted on the DVD release.

Track listing

Alternative versions and 12-inch releases
"I Can't Wait" was released as a 12-inch single in an extended 6:00 rock version in many territories, but the UK release exclusively included a longer and different version of the album track "Rock a Little (Go Ahead Lily)" running at 5:12, currently unavailable on any other release.
"Has Anyone Ever Written Anything for You?" was also released in a 12-inch version in the UK, and included a 'dub' rock version of "I Can't Wait", clocking in at 5:50.
All 7-inch and 12-inch releases of "Talk to Me" included the non-album track "One More Big Time Rock and Roll Star", written by Nicks, which later appeared with a slightly truncated ending on her 1998 retrospective boxset, Enchanted.

Personnel 
 Stevie Nicks – lead vocals, synthesizers (8)
 Rick Nowels – E-mu Emulator II (1), Oberheim OB-8 (1), Prophet-5 (1), backing vocals (1, 8, 9, 10), synthesizers (2, 3, 4, 8), guitars (9)
Jamie Sheriff – PPG Wave (1), programming (1), synth string programming (2), E-mu Emulator programming (3, 11)
 Bill Payne – synthesizers (2)
 Charles Judge – synthesizers (3, 4, 8, 9, 11), acoustic piano (11)
 Benmont Tench – acoustic piano (4), organ (5)
 Greg Phillinganes – keyboards (6), synthesizers (6), timpani (7)
 Chas Sandford – Ensoniq Mirage (7), electric guitar (7), 6-string guitar (7), 12-string guitar (7), bass (7), drum machine (7)
 Bill Cuomo – keyboards (10)
 Michael Landau – guitars (1, 3, 6, 8, 9, 11)
 George Black – guitars (1, 3), bass (1), LinnDrum programming (1), backing vocals (1, 3, 8), synth bass (3, 8), drums (8)
 Waddy Wachtel – guitars (2, 10)
 Les Dudek – guitars (3)
 Danny Kortchmar – guitars (4)
 Mike Campbell – guitars (5)
 Kenny Edwards – bass (2)
 Bob Glaub – bass (4, 5, 6)
 Mike Porcaro – bass (10)
 Steve Jordan – drums (2, 5, 6)
 Russ Kunkel – drums (4)
 Andy Newmark – drums (8, 9)
 Denny Carmassi – drums (10)
 Bobbye Hall – percussion (4)
 David Kemper – tambourine (9), percussion (11)
 Barney Wilen – saxophone (7)
 Sharon Celani – backing vocals (1-10)
 Marilyn Martin – backing vocals (1, 2, 3, 5, 6, 10)
 Lori Perry-Nicks – backing vocals
 Maria Vidal – backing vocals (1, 2, 7, 8)
 Carolyn Brooks – backing vocals (11)

Technical credits 
 Dave Hernandez – engineer (1)
 John Koverek – engineer (1, 3, 8, 9, 11), mixing (11)
 Shelly Yakus – engineer (2, 4), mixing (2, 4, 5, 7)
 Gabe Veltri – overdub engineer (2, 7), engineer (3, 5, 6, 8)
 Robert Feist – engineer (3, 9)
 David Leonard – engineer (3)
 Don Smith – overdub engineer (6), mixing (7)
 Chas Sandford – engineer (7), mixing (7)
 Gary Skardina – engineer (9)
 Brian Foraker – engineer (10)
 Dennis Sager – engineer (10)
 George Black – mixing (1, 3)
 Jimmy Iovine – mixing (1)
 Chris Lord-Alge – mixing (1)
 Rick Nowels – mixing (1, 3)
 Mick Guzauski – mixing (6)
 Herńan Rojas – mixing (8)
 Csaba Pectoz – mixing (9)
 Keith Olsen – mixing (10)
 Tom "Gondo" Gondolf – additional engineer 
 Tom Swift – additional engineer 
 John Agnello – assistant engineer
 Carol Cafiero – assistant engineer
 Mark Corbrin – assistant engineer
 Dan Garcia – assistant engineer
 David Glover – assistant engineer
 Steve Hirsch – assistant engineer
 Glen Holguin – assistant engineer
 Jon Ingoldsby – assistant engineer
 Bill Jackson – assistant engineer
 Robin Laine – assistant engineer
 Ray Leonard – assistant engineer
 Paul Levy – assistant engineer
 Casey McMackin – assistant engineer
 Frank Pekoc – assistant engineer
 Alex Schmoll – assistant engineer
 Duane Seykora – assistant engineer
 Paul Wertheimer – assistant engineer
 Bruce Wildstein – assistant engineer
 Ernie Wilkens – assistant engineer
 Barry Diament – mastering

Production credits 
 Debbie Caponetta – production coordinator 
 Beth Jacobson – production coordinator 
 Nina King – production coordinator 
 Tim McDaniel – production coordinator 
 Glen Parrish – personal manager
 Michael Hodgson – art direction, design 
 Tony McGee – front cover photography 
 Herbert Worthington III – back cover photography, inner sleeve photography 
 Stevie Nicks – handtinting back photography 
 John Reed Forsman – additional photography

Charts

Weekly charts

Year-end charts

Certifications

References

External links
[ Rock a Little] at Allmusic
Rock a Little at Rolling Stone

1985 albums
Stevie Nicks albums
Albums produced by Jimmy Iovine
Albums produced by Keith Olsen
Albums produced by Rick Nowels
Modern Records (1980) albums